A Poke in the Eye... with a Sharp Stick is a 1988 album by Raymond Watts under the moniker PIG. It was reissued in Japan in 1998 by Blue Noise. An extremely low-budget promotional video for "Shit for Brains" exists, and was released on the Best of Berlin Independence Days '88 compilation VHS.

Reception 
The album holds a 4.5/5 rating on AllMusic and is designated as their album pick of his discography.

Track listing
 "It Tolls for Thee (Pig Breath)" (Raymond Watts) – 4:25
 "Scumsberg" (Watts) – 4:02
 "One for the Neck" (Watts) – 3:54
 "Hildelinde" (traditional) – 2:45
 "My Favourite Car" (Watts) – 5:01
 "Never for Fun" (Watts) – 5:26
 "Shit for Brains" (Watts) – 4:36
 "Red Man" (Watts) – 6:06
 "The Press" (Watts) – 3:59
 "Peoria" (Watts/JG Thirlwell) – 7:13

Track 10 is neither available on vinyl releases of this album nor on the CD release YELLOW 28. The release "Sick City" (RTD M 28-1) features this track.

Personnel

PIG 
 Raymond Watts – vocals, keyboards, programming, lyrics

Guests and production 
 Hanns Joachim Mennicken – guitar on "Scumsberg"
 Alexander Hacke – guitar on tracks 1, 5, 9
 Nikkolai Weidemann – guitar, piano and saxophone on "One for the Neck"
 Axel Dill – drums and piano on "Hildelinde"
 Uwe Wurst – guitar on "My Favorite Car"
 JG Thirlwell – production, lyrics on "Peoria"
Christian Graupner – percussion on "Scumsberg" and "Red Man"
John Caffery – production on tracks 1-9

References 

Pig (musical project) albums
1988 albums
Albums produced by JG Thirlwell
Wax Trax! Records albums